Pak Phayun is a district (amphoe) of Phatthalung province, southern Thailand.

Geography
Neighboring districts are (from the west clockwise) Pa Bon and Bang Kaeo of Phatthalung Province, Krasae Sin, Sathing Phra, Singhanakhon, and Khuan Niang of Songkhla province.

To the east of the district is the Thale Luang lake, which through a narrow strait opens into Songkhla Lake south of the district.

History
The district was established in 1896 as part of the thesaphiban administrative reforms, originally subdivided into 17 tambons.

In 1903 it was renamed from Taksin (ทักษิณ, meaning 'south') to Pak Phayun.

Economy
The gathering of edible bird's nests is a significant contributor to the local economy. The state auctions off concessions to private firms for the right to collect bird's nests, largely in Ko Mak Sub-district. The province earned 450 million baht in the latest five-year concession auction for nests harvested from caves, primarily on Ko Rangnok ('Bird's Nest Island'), down from the 100 million baht a year earned in previous auctions. In decline also was the quantity of edible nests collected in Ko Mak. In 2017, 3.46 tonnes of nests were gathered, dropping from 3.6 tonnes in 2016. Bird's nests taken from the caves in Ko Mak can fetch 120,000 baht per kilogram, and when exported to China the price can reach one million baht per kilogram.

Administration
The district is divided into seven sub-districts (tambons), which are further subdivided into 63 villages (mubans). Pak Phayun is a sub-district municipality (thesaban tambon) which covers parts of tambon Pak Phayun. There are a further seven tambon administrative organizations (TAO).

References

External links
amphoe.com (Thai)

Districts of Phatthalung province